The Agreement on the Conservation of African-Eurasian Migratory Waterbirds, or African-Eurasian Waterbird Agreement (AEWA) is an independent international treaty developed under the auspices of the United Nations Environment Programme's Convention on Migratory Species. It was founded to coordinate efforts to conserve bird species migrating between European and African nations, and its current scope stretches from the Arctic to South Africa, encompassing the Canadian archipelago and the Middle East as well as Europe and Africa.

The agreement focuses on bird species that depend on wetlands for at least part of their lifecycle and cross international borders in their migration patterns. It currently covers 254 species.

Parties

Meetings
The Parties meet every few years. So far there have been seven meetings:
 7–9 November 1999 in Cape Town, South Africa
 25–27 September 2002 in Bonn, Germany
 23–27 October 2005 in Dakar, Senegal
 15–19 September 2008 in Antananarivo, Madagascar
 14–18 May 2012 in La Rochelle, France
 9–14 November 2015 in Bonn, Germany
 4–8 December 2018 in Durban, South Africa

Treaties

Ban on lead shot
The use of lead shot over wetlands has been banned by the signatories to the convention on account of the poisoning it causes.

See also
Ramsar Convention

References

External links
 of AEWA
 of Wings Over Wetlands (WOW) Project
 of World Migratory Bird Day (WMBD)
 of CMS

Convention on the Conservation of Migratory Species of Wild Animals
Bird conservation
Lead poisoning
Treaties concluded in 1995
Treaties entered into force in 1999
1995 in the Netherlands
1999 in the environment
Treaties of the Republic of the Congo
Treaties of Egypt
Treaties of the Gambia
Treaties of Guinea
Treaties of Niger
Treaties of Senegal
Treaties of the Republic of the Sudan (1985–2011)
Treaties of Togo
Treaties of Tanzania
Treaties of Benin
Treaties of Mali
Treaties of Uganda
Treaties of Mauritius
Treaties of Kenya
Treaties of South Africa
Treaties of Equatorial Guinea
Treaties of Djibouti
Treaties of Nigeria
Treaties of the Libyan Arab Jamahiriya
Treaties of Tunisia
Treaties of Ghana
Treaties of Algeria
Treaties of Guinea-Bissau
Treaties of Madagascar
Treaties of Ethiopia
Treaties of Chad
Treaties of Germany
Treaties of Jordan
Treaties of Monaco
Treaties of the Netherlands
Treaties of Spain
Treaties of Sweden
Treaties of Switzerland
Treaties of the United Kingdom
Treaties of Denmark
Treaties of Finland
Treaties of Bulgaria
Treaties of North Macedonia
Treaties of Croatia
Treaties of Moldova
Treaties of Romania
Treaties of Slovakia
Treaties of Georgia (country)
Treaties of Israel
Treaties of Albania
Treaties of Lebanon
Treaties of Ukraine
Treaties of Hungary
Treaties of Ireland
Treaties of Syria
Treaties of Slovenia
Treaties of France
Treaties of Luxembourg
Treaties of Portugal
Treaties of Uzbekistan
Treaties of Lithuania
Treaties entered into by the European Union
Treaties of Latvia
Treaties of Belgium
Treaties of the Czech Republic
Treaties of Italy
Treaties of Norway
Treaties of Cyprus
Treaties of Montenegro
Treaties of Estonia
Treaties extended to the Faroe Islands
Treaties extended to Gibraltar
Treaties extended to Guernsey
Treaties extended to Jersey
Treaties extended to the Isle of Man
Treaties extended to Saint Helena, Ascension and Tristan da Cunha
Environmental treaties